Kevin O'Connell is a sound re-recording mixer. He held the record for most Academy Award nominations without a win at 20, until he finally won his first Academy Award for Hacksaw Ridge (2016) at the 89th Academy Awards in 2017.

Early life and career
O'Connell was born in Long Island, New York and raised in Los Angeles, California. At 18, he became a projectionist at 20th Century Fox Studios, where his mother was a secretary for the head of the sound department.

Subsequently, failing the trade union examination for the job, he became a Los Angeles County firefighter for a year. At the behest of his concerned mother, alarmed at his gaunt and charred appearance following a brush fire in Sylmar, Los Angeles, he obtained a job as a machine-room operator at Warner Hollywood Studios, also known as Samuel Goldwyn Studios in 1978, where he worked on films including Grease (1978). Becoming a recording technician, he earned his first screen credit on The Empire Strikes Back (1980). His first credit as a sound mixer was on Dead Men Don't Wear Plaid (1982).

Later career
In 1993, O'Connell joined Sony Pictures as a supervising sound mixer, working on films include Armageddon (1998), Spider-Man (2002), and Transformers (2007). In October 2013, he was hired to provide mixing services and take a creative leadership role at Todd Soundelux, working in that company's Todd-AO division in Santa Monica, California. O'Connell returned to Sony Pictures Post Production Services in 2015.

He served a term as the representative of the Sound Branch in the Board of Governors of the Academy of Motion Picture Arts and Sciences.

Academy Award victory
O'Connell held the record for most Academy Award nominations without a win at 20, having originally set the record in 2006 with his 18th nomination and loss, making him the "unluckiest nominee in the history of the Academy Awards". In 2017, he won his first Academy Award at the 89th Academy Awards for Hacksaw Ridge (2016).

In his acceptance speech at the ceremony, held on February 26, 2017, O'Connell thanked his mother, Skippy, who had urged him into his profession.

Personal life
In 2001, Kevin and Heather O'Connell were married.

Accolades

Academy Awards

Primetime Emmy Award
In 1989, O'Connell, along with James L. Aicholtz, Michael Herbick and Don Johnson, won the Primetime Emmy Award for Outstanding Sound Mixing for a Miniseries or Movie for the television miniseries Lonesome Dove (1989).

Cinema Audio Society Award
Nominations
 Outstanding Achievement in Sound Mixing for Motion Pictures – Live Action – Hacksaw Ridge (2016) (shared with seven colleagues)

See also 
 List of Academy Award records

References

External links
 
 
 
 

Living people
American audio engineers

Primetime Emmy Award winners
Best Sound Mixing Academy Award winners
1957 births